Wurts is a surname. Notable people with the surname include:

Albert Wurts Whitney (1870–1943), American statistician and actuarial scientist
Bruna Wurts, Brazilian artistic roller skater
Charles Stewart Wurts (1790-1859), American businessman
George Washington Wurts (1843–1928), American diplomat and art collector
Janny Wurts (born 1953), American fantasy novelist and illustrator
John Wurts (1792–1861), American politician